Re-Animated Dead Flesh is the fifth full-length studio album by Mortician.

The album was released by Mortician Records and distributed by Crash Music, making it the first Mortician studio album not released by Relapse Records.

Track listing

The title for track #4, "Marauding Savages", is misprinted on the back cover as "Merauding Savages".

Personnel
Mortician
 Will Rahmer - bass, vocals
 Roger J. Beaujard - guitars, drum programming

Recorded, mixed, and mastered April 2004 - June 2004 at Primitive Recordings Studio
 Mortician — Producer, mixing, and mastering
 Mike Hrubovcak — Artwork
 Tom Woodard and Jeff Wolf — Photography

References

Mortician (band) albums
2004 albums